Skare or Skarde is a village in Ullensvang municipality in Vestland county, Norway. The village sits at the junction of Norwegian National Road 13 and European route E134. Skare Church is located in the village. 

References

Villages in Vestland
Ullensvang